The Zutons are an English indie rock band, formed in 2001 in Liverpool. The band are currently composed of singer, songwriter and guitarist Dave McCabe, drummer Sean Payne and saxophonist Abi Harding.

They released their debut album, Who Killed...... The Zutons? in May 2004 and achieved chart success with "Why Won't You Give Me Your Love?" and "Valerie", both taken from their second studio album Tired of Hanging Around in 2006. Both singles reached number 9 in the UK Singles Chart.

The band quietly disbanded in 2009, several months after they released the third studio album, You Can Do Anything in June 2008, with no official announcement. They ultimately reunited in September 2016 for a one-off show billed as "probably [the] last ever" in remembrance of their friend, actor and former Tramp Attack frontman Kristian Ealey.  The band remained in contact and in November 2018 announced a spring 2019 tour to commemorate and perform their debut album.

History

Formation
The Zutons formed in Liverpool in 2001, taking their name from Captain Beefheart's Magic Band guitarist Zoot Horn Rollo. Dave McCabe had previously been in the band Tramp Attack. Both Pritchard and Payne were members of Edgar Jones' post Stairs band The Big Kids (with Sean's brother Howie Payne of The Stands). The band was originally a four-piece, before Payne's girlfriend Abi Harding began joining The Zutons on stage for a couple of songs mid-set, playing simple saxophone lines. The other band members liked the way her saxophone enhanced their sound and Harding became a full member, contributing vocals and sax.

Deltasonic head Alan Wills was initially dubious about the musical talents of McCabe: "I'd heard other bands Dave had played in and I thought they were all rubbish". The Coral's James Skelly was persistent in trying to convince Wills of his friend's potential and the breakthrough finally came when the bedroom demos of the newly formed Zutons persuaded the Deltasonic head into working with them.

At first, the band had to battle comparisons to The Coral. Both bands were Merseyside bands prominent members of the Liverpool music scene, on the same record label, shared the same producer, Ian Broudie, and were good friends, with McCabe having previously written songs with James Skelly. The band's music has proved difficult to categorize, being described as "psychedelic cartoon punk". McCabe, who is also the lead songwriter, includes amongst his influences Talking Heads, Devo, Sly & the Family Stone, Dexys Midnight Runners, Sublime and Madness.

Early singles and Who Killed...... The Zutons? (2002–2005)
The first record the band put out was the 3-track CD Devil's Deal, released in September 2002. The following spring they released Creepin' and a Crawlin', and then the download-only single "Haunts Me" in November 2003. The band's "Z" logo was changed early in 2004 to avoid confusion with the Zenith logo.

The Zutons' debut album, Who Killed...... The Zutons? was released in April 2004, and initially reached No. 13 in the UK album chart. However, after nearly a year later, it managed to move up to No. 9 in early 2005. The LP had a specially printed 3-D cover and came with Zutons 3-D viewing glasses, which many fans then wore to their concerts. Early copies of the album also included a bonus 4-track CD of alternative versions of their songs. The album was critically acclaimed and was a nominee for the 2004 Mercury Music Prize. The band themselves were nominated for the British Breakthrough Act award at the 2005 BRIT Awards. The album was later re-issued following the single "Don't Ever Think (Too Much)", with that song being added as track 13. The track "Confusion" was used in a Peugeot 307 car advert in the UK during 2004-2005.

Tired of Hanging Around (2006–2007)
The new album Tired of Hanging Around was released on 17 April 2006 and reached No. 2 in the UK album charts. The first single from the album "Why Won't You Give Me Your Love?" and the second single "Valerie" both peaked at 9 in the UK charts, a fair achievement considering their highest place previously had been with the single "Don't Ever Think (Too Much)" at 15. The band toured the UK in May 2006 following the release of this album. They played at the Jersey Live Festival on 2 September 2006 before their second UK tour which began in November 2006. In October 2006, they performed at The Secret Policeman's Ball. On New Year's Eve 2006, the Zutons appeared on Jools Holland's annual Hootenanny on BBC television on which they performed their songs "Valerie", "Why Don't You Give Me Your Love?" and "It's The Little Things We Do."

As the November tour began, the band gave an interview to STV discussing songwriting, making videos and their American dates with The Killers. In a separate interview, Payne complained about the tendency of music writers and magazines to generalise a particular city as the breeding ground of new 'movements', "A lot of bands get lumped in when they're in the same neck of the woods and journalists–especially in England–like to make a big deal out of that and make it into a scene, as if the individual bands aren't good enough to write about." 

The band announced on 13 July 2007 that guitarist Boyan Chowdhury had left The Zutons, citing "musical differences". Although the band claimed Chowdhury's departure was a mutual decision, bassist Russell Pritchard remarked that "it was like splitting up with someone". In late 2007, Paul Molloy formerly of The Skylarks and The Stands joined the band.

You Can Do Anything and split (2008–2009)
The band released their third studio album titled You Can Do Anything on 2 June 2008. It was the band's first album to feature Molloy on lead guitar. The first single was "Always Right Behind You" which was released on 26 May 2008. The album was recorded earlier in the year in Los Angeles, California. On 17 May 2008 The Zutons appeared on Soccer AM as guest stars. They performed "Always Right Behind You" at the end to celebrate the last show of the season. In the summer of 2008, The Zutons had their first UK tour in 2 years. They were scheduled to play seven gigs in forest settings as part of The Forestry Commission's Forest Tour.

On 26 July 2008, The Zutons performed at Japan's Fuji Rock Festival for a third time. On 30 August 2008, the band appeared at the Indie Festival, Jersey Live, headlining the festival along with The Prodigy. Over the 2008 Christmas holidays, the Zutons were dropped from Sony/BMG.

Following a run of 2009 festival performances including Summer Sundae in Leicester and Wickerman Festival, the band quietly disbanded.

Post split and reunions
Pritchard joined Noel Gallagher's High Flying Birds, Molloy collaborated with Sean's sister, Candie Payne, before forming Serpent Power with Ian Skelly and joining The Coral and Sean Payne recorded with Miles Kane. In 2010, singer Dave McCabe was convicted of assault before releasing solo album Church of Miami in 2015. The Zutons' song "What's your Problem" was featured in a trailer for the 2012 movie Wreck-It Ralph.

Chowdhury had formed a new band, the Venus Fury shortly after his departure from the band. In May 2013, he collaborated with musician David South and scriptwriter Michelle Langan to produce Shoebox, a musical theatre play set in 1950s Liverpool. In 2016, Harding became the keyboardist and saxophonist for The Lightning Seeds, the band of the Zutons' former producer Ian Broudie.

In April 2016, three members of the band, including original guitarist Chowdhury, performed at a tribute concert for the Warrington indie rock group Viola Beach, whose members had died earlier that year in a car accident in Sweden.

On 23 June 2016, it was announced that the original line-up of the band would reform for a one-off gig at Mountford Hall, Liverpool, on 30 September 2016. A fundraiser in celebration of their friend, actor and former Tramp Attack frontman Kristian Ealey, who died earlier in the year. The show was billed as the band's "last ever". McCabe explained: "I'm not against doing gigs as The Zutons, it's the others who don't want to keep doing it, and I understand why. With two of them it's personal issues and Russ plays with Noel Gallagher." He also revealed that the band almost reformed in 2014 to mark the tenth anniversary of the band's debut album but that, "if The Zutons were ever to reform properly, I don't think it would be the original line-up".

In November 2018 the band announced a reunion tour to play Who Killed..... The Zutons?''' on its 15th anniversary. While original members Dave McCabe, Boyan Chowdhury, Sean Payne and Abi Harding were all on board, Russell Pritchard confirmed via social media that he was not taking part in the reunion tour. In place of Pritchard, Cast member Jay Lewis was recruited to play bass.

On 27 July 2021, the band announced via their Twitter page that they will support Nile Rodgers on one of the UK dates of his tour. They also confirmed that Rodgers would be producing the band's fourth studio album. On October 24, they posted a photo with Nile Rodgers shot in AbbeyRoad studios while working on their fourth album.

Discography

Studio albums
 Who Killed...... The Zutons? (2004)
 Tired of Hanging Around (2006)
 You Can Do Anything'' (2008)

References

External links

English indie rock groups
Musical groups from Liverpool
Musical groups established in 2001
Musical groups disestablished in 2009
Musical groups reestablished in 2016
British musical trios
Musical groups disestablished in 2019
Deltasonic Records artists